Herculagonum is a genus of ground beetles in the family Carabidae. There are at least three described species in Herculagonum.

Species
These three species belong to the genus Herculagonum:
 Herculagonum anassa (Darlington, 1971)  (New Guinea)
 Herculagonum anax (Darlington, 1971)  (New Guinea)
 Herculagonum atlas Baehr, 2002  (Papua)

References

Platyninae